Ramón Enrique Torres (born 1956 in Ponce, Puerto Rico) is a Puerto Rican reporter, journalist, and news anchor. He serves as the news anchor of Informe 79 from Mega TV Puerto Rico. He formerly served as the news anchor for the show Las Noticias from Univision Puerto Rico before the Network abruptly canceled on October 17, 2014 most of its live shows originated in Puerto Rico.

Torres began his career in television in 1976. He worked for nine years at Telemundo, working alongside veteran reporter Aníbal González Irizarry. In 1986, he returned to Tele-Once where he served as news anchor of Las Noticias. In 2011, he and his daughter, reporter Layza Torres, joined Tu Mañana as news anchor, alongside Elwood Cruz. Torres is also the father of actor Xavier Enrique Torres. He later worked at WMTJ as anchor of Sistema TV Informa. In 2019, Torres returned to television along with his daughter Layza to work together on its local newscast Informe 79 on WTCV.

Torres has received numerous awards for his work, like the Overseas Press Club, Agüeybana and Paoli Awards, among others. He has also worked as a radio broadcaster.

On April 4, 2022, Torres was diagnosed with throat cancer. During July of that year, he was transported to New York, New York, for treatment.

See also
List of Puerto Ricans

References

External links
Ramón Enrique Torres Profile on Univision Puerto Rico

Living people
Journalists from Ponce
Puerto Rican journalists
Puerto Rican news anchors
1956 births
People from Ponce, Puerto Rico